Sugarcane or sugar cane is a species of (often hybrid) tall, perennial grass (in the genus Saccharum, tribe Andropogoneae) that is used for sugar production. The plants are 2–6 m (6–20 ft) tall with stout, jointed, fibrous stalks that are rich in sucrose, which accumulates in the stalk internodes. Sugarcanes belong to the grass family, Poaceae, an economically important flowering plant family that includes maize, wheat, rice, and sorghum, and many forage crops. It is native to the warm temperate and tropical regions of India, Southeast Asia, and New Guinea.
Grown in tropical and subtropical regions, sugarcane is the world's largest crop by production quantity, totaling 1.9 billion tonnes in 2020, with Brazil accounting for 40% of the world total. Sugarcane accounts for 79% of sugar produced globally (most of the rest is made from sugar beets). About 70% of the sugar produced comes from Saccharum officinarum and its hybrids. All sugarcane species can interbreed, and the major commercial cultivars are complex hybrids.

Sucrose (table sugar) is extracted from sugarcane in specialized mill factories. It is consumed directly in confectionery, used to sweeten beverages, as a preservative in jams and conserves, as a decorative finish for cakes and pâtisserie, and as a raw material in the food industry. It can be fermented to produce ethanol, which is used to make alcoholic drinks like falernum, rum, and cachaça, but also to make biofuel. Sugarcane reeds are used to make pens, mats, screens, and thatch. The young, unexpanded flower head of Saccharum edule (duruka) is eaten raw, steamed, or toasted, and prepared in various ways in Southeast Asia, such as certain island communities of Indonesia as well as in Oceanic countries like Fiji.

Sugarcane was an ancient crop of the Austronesian and Papuan people. It was introduced to Polynesia, Island Melanesia, and Madagascar in prehistoric times via Austronesian sailors. It was also introduced to southern China and India by Austronesian traders around 1200 to 1000 BC. The Persians and Greeks encountered the famous "reeds that produce honey without bees" in India between the sixth and fourth centuries BC. They adopted and then spread sugarcane agriculture. Merchants began to trade in sugar, which was considered a luxurious and expensive spice, from India. In the 18th century, sugarcane plantations began in the Caribbean, South American, Indian Ocean, and Pacific island nations. The need for sugar crop laborers became a major driver of large migrations, some people voluntarily accepting indentured servitude and others forcibly imported as slaves.

Etymology
The term "sugarcane" combines the Sanskrit word, शर्करा (śárkarā, later سُكَّر sukkar from Arabic, and sucre from Middle French and Middle English) with "cane", a crop grown on plantations in the Caribbean  gana, Hindi for cane. This term was first used by Spanish settlers in the West Indies in the early 16th century.

Description

The stems grow into cane stalk, which when mature, constitutes around 75% of the entire plant. A mature stalk is typically composed of 11–16% fiber, 12–16% soluble sugars, 2–3% nonsugar carbohydrates, and 63–73% water. A sugarcane crop is sensitive to climate, soil type, irrigation, fertilizers, insects, disease control, varieties, and the harvest period. Sugarcane is a cash crop, but it is also used as livestock fodder. Sugarcane genome is one of the most complex plant genomes known, mostly due to interspecific hybridization and polyploidization.

History 

The two centers of domestication for sugarcane are one for Saccharum officinarum by Papuans in New Guinea and another for Saccharum sinense by Austronesians in Taiwan and southern China. Papuans and Austronesians originally primarily used sugarcane as food for domesticated pigs. The spread of both S. officinarum and S. sinense is closely linked to the migrations of the Austronesian peoples. Saccharum barberi was only cultivated in India after the introduction of S. officinarum.

S. officinarum was first domesticated in New Guinea and the islands east of the Wallace Line by Papuans, where it is the modern center of diversity. Beginning around 6,000 BP, several strains were selectively bred from the native Saccharum robustum. From New Guinea, it spread westwards to Maritime Southeast Asia after contact with Austronesians, where it hybridized with Saccharum spontaneum.

The second domestication center is mainland southern China and Taiwan, where S. sinense was a primary cultigen of the Austronesian peoples. Words for sugarcane are reconstructed as *təbuS or *CebuS in Proto-Austronesian, which became *tebuh in Proto-Malayo-Polynesian. It was one of the original major crops of the Austronesian peoples from at least 5,500 BP. Introduction of the sweeter S. officinarum may have gradually replaced it throughout its cultivated range in maritime Southeast Asia.

From Island Southeast Asia, S. officinarum was spread eastward into Polynesia and Micronesia by Austronesian voyagers as a canoe plant by around 3,500 BP. It was also spread westward and northward by around 3,000 BP to China and India by Austronesian traders, where it further hybridized with S. sinense and S. barberi. From there, it spread further into western Eurasia and the Mediterranean.

The earliest known production of crystalline sugar began in northern India.   The earliest evidence of sugar production comes from ancient Sanskrit and Pali texts. Around the eighth century, Muslim and Arab traders introduced sugar from medieval India to the other parts of the Abbasid Caliphate in the Mediterranean, Mesopotamia, Egypt, North Africa, and Andalusia. By the 10th century, sources state that every village in Mesopotamia grew sugarcane. It was among the early crops brought to the Americas by the Spanish, mainly Andalusians, from their fields in the Canary Islands, and the Portuguese from their fields in the Madeira Islands. An article on sugarcane cultivation in Spain is included in Ibn al-'Awwam's 12th-century Book on Agriculture.

For thousands of years, cane was a heavy and unwieldy crop that had to be cut by hand and immediately ground to release the juice inside, lest it spoil within a day or two. Even before harvest time, rows had to be dug, stalks planted and plentiful wood chopped as fuel for boiling the liquid and reducing it to crystals and molasses. From the earliest traces of cane domestication on the Pacific island of New Guinea 10,000 years ago to its island-hopping advance to ancient India in 350 B.C., sugar was locally consumed and very labor-intensive. It remained little more than an exotic spice, medicinal glaze or sweetener for elite palates.

In colonial times, sugar formed one side of the triangle trade of New World raw materials, along with European manufactured goods, and African slaves. Christopher Columbus first brought sugarcane to the Caribbean (and the New World) during his second voyage to the Americas, initially to the island of Hispaniola (modern day Haiti and the Dominican Republic). The first sugar harvest happened in Hispaniola in 1501; many sugar mills were constructed in Cuba and Jamaica by the 1520s.  The Portuguese took sugar to Brazil. By 1540, there were 800 cane sugar mills in Santa Catarina Island and there were another 2,000 on the north coast of Brazil, Demarara, and Suriname.

Sugar, often in the form of molasses, was shipped from the Caribbean to Europe or New England, where it was used to make rum. The profits from the sale of sugar were then used to purchase manufactured goods, which were then shipped to West Africa, where they were bartered for slaves. The slaves were then brought back to the Caribbean to be sold to sugar planters. The profits from the sale of the slaves were then used to buy more sugar, which was shipped to Europe. Toil in the sugar plantations became a main basis for a vast network of forced population movement, supplying people to work under brutal coercion. 

France found its sugarcane islands so valuable that it effectively traded its portion of Canada, famously dismissed by  Voltaire as "a few acres of snow", to Britain for their return of Guadeloupe, Martinique, and St. Lucia at the end of the Seven Years' War. The Dutch similarly kept Suriname, a sugar colony in South America, instead of seeking the return of the New Netherlands (New York).

Boiling houses in the 17th through 19th centuries converted sugarcane juice into raw sugar. These houses were attached to sugar plantations in the Western colonies. Slaves often ran the boiling process under very poor conditions. Rectangular boxes of brick or stone served as furnaces, with an opening at the bottom to stoke the fire and remove ashes. At the top of each furnace were up to seven copper kettles or boilers, each one smaller and hotter than the previous one. The cane juice began in the largest kettle. The juice was then heated and lime added to remove impurities. The juice was skimmed and then channeled to successively smaller kettles. The last kettle, the "teache", was where the cane juice became syrup. The next step was a cooling trough, where the sugar crystals hardened around a sticky core of molasses. This raw sugar was then shoveled from the cooling trough into hogsheads (wooden barrels), and from there into the curing house.

The passage of the 1833 Slavery Abolition Act led to the abolition of slavery through most of the British Empire, and many of the emancipated slaves no longer worked on sugarcane plantations when they had a choice. West Indian planters, therefore, needed new workers, and they found cheap labour in China and India. The people were subject to indenture, a long-established form of contract, which bound them to unfree labour for a fixed term. The conditions where the indentured servants worked were frequently abysmal, owing to a lack of care among the planters. The first ships carrying indentured labourers from India left in 1836. The migrations to serve sugarcane plantations led to a significant number of ethnic Indians, Southeast Asians, and Chinese people settling in various parts of the world. In some islands and countries, the South Asian migrants now constitute between 10 and 50% of the population. Sugarcane plantations and Asian ethnic groups continue to thrive in countries such as Fiji, South Africa, B, Sri Lanka, Malaysia, Indonesia, the Philippines, Guyana, Jamaica, Trinidad, Martinique, French Guiana, Guadeloupe, Grenada, St. Lucia, St. Vincent, St. Kitts, St. Croix, Suriname, Nevis, and Mauritius.

Between 1863 and 1900, merchants and plantation owners in Queensland and New South Wales (now part of the Commonwealth of Australia) brought between 55,000 and 62,500 people from the South Pacific Islands to work on sugarcane plantations. An estimated one-third of these workers were coerced or kidnapped into slavery (known as blackbirding). Many others were paid very low wages. Between 1904 and 1908, most of the 10,000 remaining workers were deported in an effort to keep Australia racially homogeneous and protect white workers from cheap foreign labour.

Cuban sugar derived from sugarcane was exported to the USSR, where it received price supports and was ensured a guaranteed market. The 1991 dissolution of the Soviet state forced the closure of most of Cuba's sugar industry.

Sugarcane remains an important part of the economy of Cuba, Guyana, Belize, Barbados, and Haiti, along with the
Dominican Republic, Guadeloupe, Jamaica, and other islands.

About 70% of the sugar produced globally comes from S. officinarum and hybrids using this species.

Cultivation 

It is one of the most efficient photosynthesizers in the plant kingdom. It is a C4 plant, able to convert up to 1% of incident solar energy into biomass. In primary growing regions across the tropics and subtropics, sugarcane crops can produce over 15 kg/m2 of cane. Once a major crop of the southeastern region of the United States, sugarcane cultivation declined there during the late 20th century, and is primarily confined to small plantations in Florida, Louisiana, and southeast Texas in the 21st century. Sugarcane cultivation ceased in Hawaii when the last operating sugar plantation in the state shut down in 2016.

Sugarcane is cultivated in the tropics and subtropics in areas with a plentiful supply of water for a continuous period of more than 6–7 months each year, either from natural rainfall or through irrigation. The crop does not tolerate severe frosts. Therefore, most of the world's sugarcane is grown between 22°N and 22°S, and some up to 33°N and 33°S. When sugarcane crops are found outside this range, such as the Natal region of South Africa, it is normally due to anomalous climatic conditions in the region, such as warm ocean currents that sweep down the coast. In terms of altitude, sugarcane crops are found up to  close to the equator in countries such as Colombia, Ecuador, and Peru.

Sugarcane can be grown on many soils ranging from highly fertile, well-drained mollisols, through heavy cracking vertisols, infertile acid oxisols and ultisols, peaty histosols, to rocky andisols. Both plentiful sunshine and water supplies increase cane production. This has made desert countries with good irrigation facilities such as Egypt some of the highest-yielding sugarcane-cultivating regions. Sugarcane consumes 9% of the world's potash fertilizer production.

Although some sugarcanes produce seeds, modern stem cutting has become the most common reproduction method. Each cutting must contain at least one bud, and the cuttings are sometimes hand-planted. In more technologically advanced countries, such as the United States and Australia, billet planting is common. Billets (stalks or stalk sections) harvested by a mechanical harvester are planted by a machine that opens and recloses the ground. Once planted, a stand can be harvested several times; after each harvest, the cane sends up new stalks, called ratoons. Successive harvests give decreasing yields, eventually justifying replanting. Two to 10 harvests are usually made depending on the type of culture. In a country with a mechanical agriculture looking for a high production of large fields, as in North America, sugarcanes are replanted after two or three harvests to avoid a lowering yields. In countries with a more traditional type of agriculture with smaller fields and hand harvesting, as in the French island of Réunion, sugarcane is often harvested up to 10 years before replanting.

Sugarcane is harvested by hand and mechanically. Hand harvesting accounts for more than half of production, and is dominant in the developing world. In hand harvesting, the field is first set on fire. The fire burns up dry leaves, and chases away or kills venomous snakes, without harming the stalks and roots. Harvesters then cut the cane just above ground-level using cane knives or machetes. A skilled harvester can cut  of sugarcane per hour.

Mechanical harvesting uses a combine, or sugarcane harvester. The Austoft 7000 series, the original modern harvester design, has now been copied by other companies, including Cameco / John Deere. The machine cuts the cane at the base of the stalk, strips the leaves, chops the cane into consistent lengths and deposits it into a transporter following alongside. The harvester then blows the trash back onto the field. Such machines can harvest  each hour, but harvested cane must be rapidly processed. Once cut, sugarcane begins to lose its sugar content, and damage to the cane during mechanical harvesting accelerates this decline. This decline is offset because a modern chopper harvester can complete the harvest faster and more efficiently than hand cutting and loading. Austoft also developed a series of hydraulic high-lift infield transporters to work alongside its harvesters to allow even more rapid transfer of cane to, for example, the nearest railway siding. This mechanical harvesting does not require the field to be set on fire; the residue left in the field by the machine consists of cane tops and dead leaves, which serve as mulch for the next planting.

Pests 
The cane beetle (also known as cane grub) can substantially reduce crop yield by eating roots; it can be controlled with imidacloprid (Confidor) or chlorpyrifos (Lorsban). Other important pests are the larvae of some butterfly/moth species, including the turnip moth, the sugarcane borer (Diatraea saccharalis), the African sugarcane borer (Eldana saccharina), the Mexican rice borer (Eoreuma loftini), the African armyworm (Spodoptera exempta), leafcutter ants, termites, spittlebugs (especially Mahanarva fimbriolata and Deois flavopicta), and Migdolus fryanus (a beetle). The planthopper insect Eumetopina flavipes acts as a virus vector, which causes the sugarcane disease ramu stunt. Sesamia grisescens is a major pest in Papua New Guinea and so is a serious concern for the Australian industry were it to cross over. To head off such a problem, the Federal Government has pre-announced that they would cover 80% of response costs if it were necessary.

Pathogens 

Numerous pathogens infect sugarcane, such as sugarcane grassy shoot disease caused by Candidatus Phytoplasma sacchari, whiptail disease or sugarcane smut, pokkah boeng caused by Fusarium moniliforme, Xanthomonas axonopodis bacteria causes Gumming Disease, and red rot disease caused by Colletotrichum falcatum. Viral diseases affecting sugarcane include sugarcane mosaic virus, maize streak virus, and sugarcane yellow leaf virus.

Yang et al., 2017 provides a genetic map developed for USDA ARS-run breeding programs for brown rust of sugarcane.

Nitrogen fixation
Some sugarcane varieties are capable of fixing atmospheric nitrogen in association with the bacterium Gluconacetobacter diazotrophicus. Unlike legumes and other nitrogen-fixing plants that form root nodules in the soil in association with bacteria, G. diazotrophicus lives within the intercellular spaces of the sugarcane's stem. Coating seeds with the bacteria is a newly developed technology that can enable every crop species to fix nitrogen for its own use.

Conditions for sugarcane workers
At least 20,000 people are estimated to have died of chronic kidney disease in Central America in the past two decades – most of them sugarcane workers along the Pacific coast. This may be due to working long hours in the heat without adequate fluid intake.
Not only are they dying because of exhaustion but some of the workers are being exposed to several hazards such as, high temperatures, harmful pesticides, and poisonous or venomous animals. This all occurs during the process of cutting the sugarcane manually, also causing physical ailments by doing the same movements for hours every work day.

Processing 

Traditionally, sugarcane processing requires two stages. Mills extract raw sugar from freshly harvested cane and "mill-white" sugar is sometimes produced immediately after the first stage at sugar-extraction mills, intended for local consumption. Sugar crystals appear naturally white in color during the crystallization process. Sulfur dioxide is added to inhibit the formation of color-inducing molecules and to stabilize the sugar juices during evaporation. Refineries, often located nearer to consumers in North America, Europe, and Japan, then produce refined white sugar, which is 99% sucrose. These two stages are slowly merging. Increasing affluence in the sugarcane-producing tropics increases demand for refined sugar products, driving a trend toward combined milling and refining.

Milling

Sugarcane processing produces cane sugar (sucrose) from sugarcane. Other products of the processing include bagasse, molasses, and filtercake.

Bagasse, the residual dry fiber of the cane after cane juice has been extracted, is used for several purposes:
fuel for the boilers and kilns
production of paper, paperboard products, and reconstituted panelboard
agricultural mulch
as a raw material for production of chemicals

The primary use of bagasse and bagasse residue is as a fuel source for the boilers in the generation of process steam in sugar plants. Dried filtercake is used as an animal feed supplement, fertilizer, and source of sugarcane wax.

Molasses is produced in two forms: blackstrap, which has a characteristic strong flavor, and a purer molasses syrup. Blackstrap molasses is sold as a food and dietary supplement. It is also a common ingredient in animal feed, and is used to produce ethanol, rum, and citric acid. Purer molasses syrups are sold as molasses, and may also be blended with maple syrup, invert sugars, or corn syrup. Both forms of molasses are used in baking.

Refining 

Sugar refining further purifies the raw sugar. It is first mixed with heavy syrup and then centrifuged in a process called "affination". Its purpose is to wash away the sugar crystals' outer coating, which is less pure than the crystal interior. The remaining sugar is then dissolved to make a syrup, about 60% solids by weight.

The sugar solution is clarified by the addition of phosphoric acid and calcium hydroxide, which combine to precipitate calcium phosphate. The calcium phosphate particles entrap some impurities and absorb others, and then float to the top of the tank, where they can be skimmed off. An alternative to this "phosphatation" technique is "carbonatation", which is similar, but uses carbon dioxide and calcium hydroxide to produce a calcium carbonate precipitate.

After filtering any remaining solids, the clarified syrup is decolorized by filtration through activated carbon. Bone char or coal-based activated carbon is traditionally used in this role. Some remaining color-forming impurities are adsorbed by the carbon. The purified syrup is then concentrated to supersaturation and repeatedly crystallized in a vacuum, to produce white refined sugar. As in a sugar mill, the sugar crystals are separated from the molasses by centrifuging. Additional sugar is recovered by blending the remaining syrup with the washings from affination and again crystallizing to produce brown sugar. When no more sugar can be economically recovered, the final molasses still contains 20–30% sucrose and 15–25% glucose and fructose.

To produce granulated sugar, in which individual grains do not clump, sugar must be dried, first by heating in a rotary dryer, and then by blowing cool air through it for several days.

Ribbon cane syrup 
Ribbon cane is a subtropical type that was once widely grown in the Southern United States, as far north as coastal North Carolina. The juice was extracted with horse- or mule-powered crushers; the juice was boiled, like maple syrup, in a flat pan, and then used in the syrup form as a food sweetener. It is not currently a commercial crop, but a few growers find ready sales for their product.

Production

In 2020, global production of sugarcane was 1.87 billion tonnes, with Brazil producing 40% of the world total, India with 20%, and China producing 6% (table).

Worldwide, 26 million hectares were devoted to sugarcane cultivation in 2020. The average worldwide yield of sugarcane crops in 2020 was 71 tonnes per hectare, led by Peru with 123 tonnes per hectare. The theoretical possible yield for sugarcane is about 280 tonnes per hectare per year, and small experimental plots in Brazil have demonstrated yields of 236–280 tonnes of cane per hectare.

From 2008 to 2016, production of standards-compliant sugarcane experienced a compound annual growth rate of about 52%, while conventional sugarcane increased at less than 1%.

Environmental Impacts

Soil degradation and erosion 
The cultivation of sugarcane can lead to increased soil loss through the removal of soil at harvest, as well as improper irrigation practices, which can result in erosion. Erosion is especially significant when the sugarcane is grown on slopes or hillsides, which increases the rate of water runoff. Generally, it is recommended that sugarcane is not planted in areas with a slope greater than 8%. However, in certain areas, such as parts of the Caribbean and South Africa, slopes greater than 20% have been planted. Increased erosion can lead to the removal of organic and nutrient-rich material, which can decrease future crop yields. It can also result in sediments and other pollutants being washed into aquatic habitats.

Sugarcane cultivation can also result in soil compaction, which is caused by the use of heavy, infield machinery. Along with impacting invertebrate and fauna within the upper layers of the soil, compaction can also lead to decreased porosity. This in turn can increase surface runoff, resulting in greater leaching and erosion.

Habitat destruction 

Nutrient-rich runoff from sugarcane fields can contribute to eutrophication of adjacent water bodies.
Due to the large quantity of water required, sugarcane cultivation heavily relies on irrigation. Large amounts of soil are removed with the crop during harvest, significant washing occurs during the processing phase. In many countries, such as India and Australia, this requirement has placed a strain on available resources, requiring the construction of barrages and other dams. This has altered the amount of water reaching aquatic habitats, and has contributed to the degradation of habitats such as the Great Barrier Reef.

Sugarcane has also contributed to habitat destruction through the clearance of land. Seven countries around the world devote more than 50% of their land to the cultivation of sugarcane. Sugarcane fields have replaced tropical rain forests and wetlands. While the majority of this clearance occurred in the past, expansions have occurred within the past couple decades, further contributing to habitat destruction.

Ethanol 

Ethanol is generally available as a byproduct of sugar production. It can be used as a biofuel alternative to gasoline, and is widely used in cars in Brazil. It is an alternative to gasoline, and may become the primary product of sugarcane processing, rather than sugar,

In Brazil, gasoline is required to contain at least 22% bioethanol. This bioethanol is sourced from Brazil's large sugarcane crop.

The production of ethanol from sugarcane is more energy efficient than from corn or sugar beets or palm/vegetable oils, particularly if cane bagasse is used to produce heat and power for the process. Furthermore, if biofuels are used for crop production and transport, the fossil energy input needed for each ethanol energy unit can be very low. EIA estimates that with an integrated sugar cane to ethanol technology, the well-to-wheels CO2 emissions can be 90% lower than conventional gasoline. A textbook on renewable energy describes the energy transformation:

Presently, 75 tons of raw sugar cane are produced annually per hectare in Brazil. The cane delivered to the processing plant is called burned and cropped (b&c), and represents 77% of the mass of the raw cane. The reason for this reduction is that the stalks are separated from the leaves (which are burned and whose ashes are left in the field as fertilizer), and from the roots that remain in the ground to sprout for the next crop. Average cane production is, therefore, 58 tons of b&c per hectare per year.
Each ton of b&c yields 740 kg of juice (135 kg of sucrose and 605 kg of water) and 260 kg of moist bagasse (130 kg of dry bagasse). Since the lower heating value of sucrose is 16.5 MJ/kg, and that of the bagasse is 19.2 MJ/kg, the total heating value of a ton of b&c is 4.7 GJ of which 2.2 GJ come from the sucrose and 2.5 from the bagasse.
Per hectare per year, the biomass produced corresponds to 0.27 TJ. This is equivalent to 0.86 W per square meter. Assuming an average insolation of 225 W per square meter, the photosynthetic efficiency of sugar cane is 0.38%.
The 135 kg of sucrose found in 1 ton of b&c are transformed into 70 litres of ethanol with a combustion energy of 1.7 GJ. The practical sucrose-ethanol conversion efficiency is, therefore, 76% (compare with the theoretical 97%).
One hectare of sugar cane yields 4,000 litres of ethanol per year (without any additional energy input, because the bagasse produced exceeds the amount needed to distill the final product). This, however, does not include the energy used in tilling, transportation, and so on. Thus, the solar energy-to-ethanol conversion efficiency is 0.13%.

Bagasse applications

Sugarcane is a major crop in many countries. It is one of the plants with the highest bioconversion efficiency. Sugarcane crop is able to efficiently fix solar energy, yielding some 55 tonnes of dry matter per hectare of land annually. After harvest, the crop produces sugar juice and bagasse, the fibrous dry matter. This dry matter is biomass with potential as fuel for energy production. Bagasse can also be used as an alternative source of pulp for paper production.

Sugarcane bagasse is a potentially abundant source of energy for large producers of sugarcane, such as Brazil, India, and China. According to one report, with use of latest technologies, bagasse produced annually in Brazil has the potential of meeting 20% of Brazil's energy consumption by 2020.

Electricity production
A number of countries, in particular those lacking fossil fuels, have implemented energy conservation and efficiency measures to minimize the energy used in cane processing, and export any excess electricity to the grid. Bagasse is usually burned to produce steam, which in turn creates electricity. Current technologies, such as those in use in Mauritius, produce over 100 kWh of electricity per tonne of bagasse. With a total world harvest of over one billion tonnes of sugar cane per year, the global energy potential from bagasse is over 100,000 GWh. Using Mauritius as a reference, an annual potential of 10,000 GWh of additional electricity could be produced throughout Africa. Electrical generation from bagasse could become quite important, particularly to the rural populations of sugarcane producing nations.

Recent cogeneration technology plants are being designed to produce from 200 to over 300 kWh of electricity per tonne of bagasse. As sugarcane is a seasonal crop, shortly after harvest the supply of bagasse would peak, requiring power generation plants to strategically manage the storage of bagasse.

Biogas production
A greener alternative to burning bagasse for the production of electricity is to convert bagasse into biogas. Technologies are being developed to use enzymes to transform bagasse into advanced biofuel and biogas.

Sugarcane as food 

In most countries where sugarcane is cultivated, several foods and popular dishes are derived directly from it, such as:
 Raw sugarcane: chewed to extract the juice
 Sayur nganten: an Indonesian soup made with the stem of trubuk (Saccharum edule), a type of sugarcane
 Sugarcane juice: a combination of fresh juice, extracted by hand or small mills, with a touch of lemon and ice to make a popular drink, known variously as air tebu, usacha rass, guarab, guarapa, guarapo, papelón, aseer asab, ganna sharbat, mosto, caldo de cana, or nước mía
 Syrup: a traditional sweetener in soft drinks, now largely supplanted in the US by high fructose corn syrup, which is less expensive because of corn subsidies and sugar tariffs
 Molasses: used as a sweetener and a syrup accompanying other foods, such as cheese or cookies
 Jaggery: a solidified molasses, known as gur, gud, or gul in South Asia, is traditionally produced by evaporating juice to make a thick sludge, and then cooling and molding it in buckets. Modern production partially freeze dries the juice to reduce caramelization and lighten its color. It is used as sweetener in cooking traditional entrees, sweets, and desserts.
 Falernum: a sweet, and slightly alcoholic drink made from sugarcane juice
 Cachaça: the most popular distilled alcoholic beverage in Brazil; it is a liquor made of the distillation of sugarcane juice.
 Rum is a liquor made from sugarcane products, typically molasses, but sometimes also cane juice. It is most commonly produced in the Caribbean and environs.
 Basi is a fermented alcoholic beverage made from sugarcane juice produced in the Philippines and Guyana.
 Panela, solid pieces of sucrose and fructose obtained from the boiling and evaporation of sugarcane juice, is a food staple in Colombia and other countries in South and Central America.
 Rapadura is a sweet flour that is one of the simplest refinings of sugarcane juice, common in Latin American countries such as Brazil, Argentina, and Venezuela (where it is known as papelón) and the Caribbean.
 Rock candy: crystallized cane juice
 Gâteau de Sirop
Viche, a homebrewed Colombian alcoholic beverage

Sugarcane as feed
Many parts of the sugarcane are commonly used as animal feeds where the plants are cultivated. The leaves make a good forage for ruminants.

Gallery

See also
 Sugar plantations in the Caribbean
 Sugar plantations in Hawaii
 Sugar industry of the Philippines
 Trapiche

References

External links
 
 
 Global sugar & sugar cane production stats from oecd.

Sugar
Crops originating from Asia
Energy crops
Ethanol fuel
Flora of tropical Asia
Articles containing video clips
Crops
Tropical agriculture
Plant common names